Thatdao Nuekjang (born 3 February 1994) is a Thai volleyball player. She is a current member of the Thailand women's national volleyball team.

Career
She is on the list 2019 Korea-Thailand all star super match competition.

Clubs
  Thai-Denmark Khonkaen Star (2012–2020)
  JT Marvelous (2020–present)

Awards

Individuals
 2015 VTV Cup Championship – "Best Middle Blocker"
 2016–17 Thailand League – "Best Middle Blocker"
 2020 Thailand League – "Best Middle Blocker"

Clubs
 2012–13 Thailand League –  Champion, with Idea Khonkaen
 2013 Thai–Denmark Super League –  Champion, with Idea Khonkaen
2019 Thai-Denmark Super League –  Bronze medal, with Thai-Denmark Khonkaen Star
2020 Thailand League –  Runner-up, with Khonkaen Star
2020 Empress's Cup All Japan Volleyball Championship –  Champion, with JT Marvelous
2020–21 Japan V.League Division 1 Women's –  Champion, with JT Marvelous

Royal decoration 
 2013 -  Commander (Third Class) of The Most Exalted Order of the White Elephant

References

Living people
Thatdao Nuekjang
Thatdao Nuekjang
JT Marvelous players
Thai expatriate sportspeople in Japan
Expatriate volleyball players in Japan
Asian Games medalists in volleyball
Volleyball players at the 2014 Asian Games
Volleyball players at the 2018 Asian Games
1994 births
Thatdao Nuekjang
Thatdao Nuekjang
Medalists at the 2014 Asian Games
Medalists at the 2018 Asian Games
Universiade medalists in volleyball
Thatdao Nuekjang
Southeast Asian Games medalists in volleyball
Competitors at the 2013 Southeast Asian Games
Universiade bronze medalists for Thailand
Competitors at the 2019 Southeast Asian Games
Middle blockers
Medalists at the 2013 Summer Universiade
Competitors at the 2021 Southeast Asian Games
Thatdao Nuekjang
Thatdao Nuekjang